The Croton Watershed is the New York City water supply system's name for its southernmost watershed and its infrastructure, an organized entity rather than a mere hydrological feature.   Spanning large swaths of Putnam and Westchester counties in far southeastern New York State, it represents the drainage, flow, and operating systems of some seven rivers, one dozen reservoirs, and three controlled lakes falling within the Croton River watershed.

The vast majority of this ends up at the Jerome Park Reservoir in the Bronx via the New Croton Aqueduct, from which it is distributed. Water in excess of New York City's needs spills over the New Croton Dam at the New Croton Reservoir and is carried by the Croton River into the Hudson River at Croton-on-Hudson, New York, about 30 miles north of the Metropolitan area.

Definition

The Croton Watershed is a term describing a part of the New York City water supply system.  It is not synonymous with the biological feature Croton River watershed.  Numerous small natural lakes and ponds, as well as large Lake Mahopac, are within the river's watershed but not part of the NYC water supply system (even though they too ultimately drain into it). A map of the actual Croton Watershed is found here.

The Croton River is a river in southern New York with three principal tributaries: the West Branch, Middle Branch, and East Branch.  Their waters, all part of the New York City water supply system, join downstream from the Croton Falls Reservoir. Together, their waters and the reservoirs linked to them represent the northern half of the New York City water system's Croton Watershed.

Shortly after the confluence of the three Croton River branches the Croton River proper, along with its tributary, the Muscoot River, flows into the Muscoot Reservoir, after which it empties into the New Croton Reservoir, which feeds the New Croton Aqueduct supplying water to New York City via the Jerome Park Reservoir in the Bronx.

Watershed

Waterways
 Croton River
 West Branch
 Middle Branch
 East Branch
 Titicus River
 Muscoot River
 Cross River

Reservoirs
 Boyds Corner
 West Branch
 Middle Branch
 Croton Falls / Diverting
 East Branch / Bog Brook
 Titicus
 Cross River
 Amawalk
 Muscoot
 New Croton

Controlled lakes
 Kirk
 Gilead
 Gleneida

Aqueduct
 The New Croton Aqueduct, completed in 1890, brings water from the New Croton Reservoir in Westchester and Putnam counties.

Recreation
Limited recreation is permitted within the Croton Watershed.  Its guidelines and requirements are listed here.

Notes

See also
 Old Croton Aqueduct
 Catskill Aqueduct
 Delaware Aqueduct
 Water supply network

References

External links
 NYC DEP Watershed Recreation
 NYC DEP Watershed Protection
 NYC DEP Watershed History

 
Water infrastructure of New York City
Watersheds of the United States